Sri Lanka participated in the 2013 Asian Youth Games in Nanjing, China. The team consisted of 37 athletes, who competed in eight different sports. The team was overseen by fifteen officials.

Athletics

The Sri Lankan team consists of 10 athletes.
(q – qualified, NM – no mark, SB – season best PB – personal best)
Boys'
Track events

Field event

Girls'
Track events

Field event

Rugby sevens

Sri Lanka's rugby team consists of 12 athletes.
Roster

Kevin Dixon
Omalka Gunaratne
Gayashan Gunathilake
Lasidu Karunatilaka
Adrian Kurumbalapitiya
Dilan Neuman
Thakshina Nonis
Mohamed Salih
Ramesh Thewara
Indunil Warusavithana
George Weerakoon
Wiraj Weerasekara

Pool B

Quarterfinals 

Fifth to Eighth placement 

Fifth place match

Shooting

Sri Lanka has qualified 3 shooters.

Squash

Sri Lanka has qualified two squash athletes.

Boy

Girl

Swimming

Boy

Girl

Table tennis

Sri Lanka has qualified four athletes in table tennis.
Boys'

Girls'

Tennis

Sri Lanka has qualified two athletes in tennis.

Boy

Girl

Mixed Doubles

Weightlifting

Sri Lanka has qualified two athletes.

Boy

Girl

References

External links
List of athletes

Asian Indoor Youth Games
Asian Youth 2013
Sri Lanka
2013